Fox Point is a settlement in Newfoundland and Labrador.

See also
List of lighthouses in Canada

References

External links
 Aids to Navigation Canadian Coast Guard

Populated places in Newfoundland and Labrador
Lighthouses in Newfoundland and Labrador